Sir Richard Everard, 1st Baronet (died 1680) was an English politician who sat in the House of Commons  in 1654 and 1656.

Everard was the son of Hugh Everard of Great Waltham, Essex, and his wife Mary Brand daughter of Thomas Brand or Bond of Great Hormead, Hertfordshire. He matriculated from Jesus College, Cambridge at Easter 1617 and was admitted at Lincoln's Inn on 10 June 1619. He was created a baronet, of Much Waltham on 29 January 1629. In 1644 he became High Sheriff of Essex.

In 1654, Everard was elected Member of Parliament for Essex in the First Protectorate Parliament. He was re-elected MP for Essex in the Second Protectorate Parliament.
 
Everard married Joan Barrington, daughter of Sir Francis Barrington, 1st Baronet. He was succeeded in the baronetcy by his sons Richard and then Hugh.

References

1680 deaths
Baronets in the Baronetage of England
Year of birth missing
English MPs 1654–1655
English MPs 1656–1658